The Lowery Clevenger House is a Colonial Revival wood-frame house, located at 1013 2nd in Las Vegas, New Mexico. Built around 1905, it was listed on the National Register of Historic Places in 1985. In 1919, it was the home of Santa Fe Railroad conductor Lowery Clevenger.

References

National Register of Historic Places in San Miguel County, New Mexico
Colonial Revival architecture in New Mexico
Houses completed in 1905
1905 establishments in New Mexico Territory